Freckle Juice is a 1971 children's chapter book by Judy Blume with illustrations by Sonia O. Lisker. It is about a second grade student who wants to have freckles.

Summary 
Andrew Marcus desperately wants to have freckles like his classmate, Nicky Lane, who he sits behind. Nicky has freckles and Andrew does not. Nicky had lots of them on his face (about eighty-six). So Andrew wants some just so that his mother will never notice when his neck is dirty. While Andrew and his classmates were reading, he's eavesdropping on Nicky and tried to count his freckles. But when Andrew got to eighty-six his teacher, Miss Kelly (who caught him eavesdropping on Nicky), asked him if he was paying attention. His classmate, Sharon, knowing this, sells him a recipe for a so-called potion called "freckle juice" for fifty cents, which she claims will allow him to sprout freckles just like Nicky's. It is nothing more than a nauseating mix of grape juice and assorted condiments that only serves to make Andrew sick enough to miss school the next day.  

Realizing that Sharon had swindled him, Andrew dots his face and neck with a blue magic marker (since he could not find a brown one) to try to show her that the "freckle juice" had worked.  Unfortunately for him, no one is fooled by his drawn-on freckles.  After recess, Miss Kelly gently sends him to the restroom with her "secret formula" for removing freckles, which turns out to be a bar of lemon-scented soap.  Andrew washes his "freckles" off and humbly returns to class, where Miss Kelly tells him that he is a very handsome boy without freckles.  Suddenly, Nicky then asks her for the "magic freckle remover", claiming that he hates his freckles, but she tells him they did not look right on Andrew, but that he looks wonderful with them.  The story ends with Sharon trying to sell him her "secret recipe" for a so-called potion for removing freckles.

Reviews 

"This convincing small boy adventure proceeds smoothly to a satisfying conclusion. The conniving little girl, understanding teacher, and feckless, freckleless boy are amusingly depicted in the impish black-and-white illustrations and in the story which is especially suited for reading aloud to second-and third-graders." —Library Journal

"Spontaneous humor, sure to appeal to the youngest reader. The amusing sketches and the well-spaced type make an inviting volume." —The Horn Book Magazine

External links
Judy Blume: Freckle Juice

1971 children's books
Children's fiction books
American children's books
Books by Judy Blume